The 14th Lok Sabha (17 May 2004 – 18 May 2009) was convened after the 2004 Indian general election held in four phases during 20 April – 10 May 2004, which led to the formation of first Manmohan Singh ministry (2004–2009). Indian National Congress-led United Progressive Alliance won 62 more seats than previous 13th Lok Sabha. The Lok Sabha (House of the People) is the lower house in the Parliament of India. 8 sitting members from Rajya Sabha, the Upper House of Indian Parliament, were elected to 14th Lok Sabha after the 2004 Indian general election.

The next 15th Lok Sabha was convened after 2009 Indian general election.

Bills
During the tenure of the 14th Lok Sabha, 60% of bills were referred to Parliamentary committees for examination.

Members 

 Speaker: Somnath Chatterjee, Communist Party of India (Marxist), Bolpur, West Bengal
 Deputy Speaker: Charanjit Singh Atwal, Shiromani Akali Dal, Phillaur, Punjab
 Leader of the House: Pranab Mukherjee, Indian National Congress, Jangipur, West Bengal (PM Manmohan Singh was from Upper house)
 Leader of the Opposition: Lal Krishna Advani, Bharatiya Janata Party, Gandhinagar, Gujarat
 Secretary General: P.D.T. Acharya

Expulsion of members for contempt of the House 

On 12 December 2005, the Star TV news channel telecast the sting operation Operation Duryodhana, in which 11 Members of Parliament, 10 from Lok Sabha and 1 from Rajya Sabha, were apparently caught on video receiving cash inducements in return for raising questions in the Parliament. Following swift inquiries by the Ethics Committee of Rajya Sabha and a Special Committee of the Lok Sabha the members were found guilty and the motion for their expulsion was adopted in respective Houses.

On 23 December 2005, the following 10 members were ousted from the 14th Lok Sabha as per the adoption of the motion calling for their expulsion:

 Narendra Kushwaha (BSP) – Mirzapur, Uttar Pradesh
 Annasaheb M. K. Patil (BJP) – Erandol, Maharashtra
 Y. G. Mahajan (BJP) – Jalgaon, Maharashtra
 Manoj Kumar (RJD) – Palamau, Jharkhand
 Suresh Chandel (BJP) – Hamirpur, Himachal Pradesh
 Raja Ram Pal (BSP) – Bilhaur, Uttar Pradesh
 Lal Chandra Kol (BSP) – Robertsganj, Uttar Pradesh
 Pradeep Gandhi (BJP) – Rajnandgaon, Chhattisgarh
 Chandra Pratap Singh (BJP) – Sidhi, Madhya Pradesh
 Ramsevak Singh (Congress) – Gwalior, Madhya Pradesh

List of members by political party

References

External links

 14th Lok Sabha Members by Constituency Lok Sabha website
 Lok Sabha website
 Legislative Business in the 14th Lok Sabha – PRS Legislative Research

 
Terms of the Lok Sabha
2004 establishments in India
2009 disestablishments in India